This is a list of events in Scottish television from 2004.

Events

January
 8 January – STV launches a new political magazine programme, called Politics Now. It replaces Platform, and Grampian's politics and current affairs programme Crossfire.

February
 2 February – SMG’s sells its stake in GMTV to ITV plc for £31 million.

March
9 March – An NFO System Three poll conducted for the Scottish Consumer Council indicates that 70% of those questioned are in favour of a Scottish Six news programme replacing the main BBC Six O'Clock News from London.

April
20 April – 40th anniversary of BBC Two Scotland.

May to December
No events.

Unknown
 Autumn – The lunchtime edition of Scotland Today is axed.

Debuts

BBC
21 September – Shoebox Zoo on BBC One (2004–2005)

ITV
30 September – High Times on STV (2004–2008)
Unknown – Politics Now on STV (2004–2011)

Television series
Scotsport (1957–2008)
Reporting Scotland (1968–1983; 1984–present)
Scotland Today (1972–2009)
Sportscene (1975–present)
The Beechgrove Garden (1978–present)
Grampian Today (1980–2009)
Taggart (1983–2010)
Only an Excuse? (1993–2020)
Monarch of the Glen (2000–2005)
Balamory (2002–2005)
Still Game (2002–2007; 2016–2019)
River City (2002–present)
The Karen Dunbar Show (2003–2006)

Ending this year
2 September – Jeopardy (2002–2004)
22 October – Win, Lose or Draw (1990–2004)
Unknown – Crossfire (1984–2004)

Deaths
27 January – Rikki Fulton, 79, comedian
26 February – Russell Hunter, 79, actor
31 July – Robert James, 80, actor
28 November – Molly Weir, 94, actress
Unknown – Jimmy Mack, 70, broadcaster
Unknown – Ron Thomson, 75, journalist

See also
2004 in Scotland

References

 
Television in Scotland by year
2000s in Scottish television